Heiligenstadt  is a station on  of the Vienna U-Bahn (an urban rapid-transit system). Beside the U-Bahn station is the Wien Heiligenstadt railway station, which is served by Vienna S-Bahn lines S40 and S45.

Both stations are located in the Döbling District. The U-Bahn station opened in 1976.

References

Buildings and structures in Döbling
Railway stations opened in 1976
Vienna U-Bahn stations
1976 establishments in Austria
Railway stations in Austria opened in the 20th century

de:U-Bahn-Station Heiligenstadt